Joshua Timothy Katz (born September 12, 1969) is an American linguist and classicist who was the Cotsen Professor in the Humanities at Princeton University until May 2022. He is a scholar on the languages, literatures, and cultures of ancient and medieval history. Currently, he is a nonresident senior fellow at the American Enterprise Institute.

In 2020, Katz wrote an essay in Quillette which included criticisms of a former black student activist group at Princeton, leading to a backlash on the Princeton campus and the rescinding of a conference invitation by the American Council of Learned Societies. Katz's contentions that his views were being suppressed attracted support from conservatives and some academic freedom advocates.

In 2021, The Daily Princetonian reported that Katz had been suspended in 2018 for engaging in a consensual sexual relationship with a student in violation of university policy. In May 2022, he was fired after a second investigation concluded that he had lied during the 2018 sexual misconduct investigation.

Early life and education 
Katz was born in New York in 1969, the son of chemist Thomas J. Katz. He attended the Dalton School in New York City before attending Yale University for his bachelor's degree in linguistics, graduating summa cum laude. After graduating from Yale, Katz attended the University of Oxford on a Marshall Scholarship and earned a master's degree in general linguistics and comparative philology in 1993. He completed a PhD in linguistics at Harvard University in 1998.

Academic career 
Katz joined the faculty of Princeton University as a classics lecturer in 1998 and, by 2006, had received tenure as an associate professor. From September 2002 to August 2003, Katz was a member of the School of Historical Studies at the Institute for Advanced Study. In 2008, he became full-time professor at Princeton. He has since held visiting professorships at the École Pratique des Hautes Études, Université Paris Diderot, and the University of Berlin.

Katz became a popular undergraduate teacher at Princeton and was awarded the President's Award for Distinguished Teaching in 2003, the Phi Beta Kappa Teaching Award in 2008, and the Sophie and L. Edward Cotsen Faculty Fellowship. He was praised by the university for “the care he takes with students in and out of the classroom” and was recognized as one of four faculty members for outstanding teaching in 2003, with a class of his making The Daily Beasts list of "hottest college courses" in 2011. Katz was president of Princeton's Phi Beta Kappa society for two terms, department representative for the classics from 2003 to 2005, a member of the Faculty-Student Committee on Discipline, and director of the Behrman Undergraduate Society of Fellows, which he founded in 2009.

He chairs the selection committee of the Barry Scholarship at the University of Oxford.

Political controversy and sexual misconduct investigations 

Katz was investigated by Princeton twice, stemming from a relationship he had with a student around 2005. Before the second investigation, he wrote a controversial opinion piece about race on campus, near the peak of the 2020 George Floyd protests. The second investigation over his student relationship, which led to his termination, created its own controversy over possible free speech suppression, since it came on the heels of Katz's previous controversy.

First investigation 
A Princeton University investigation in 2018 found that during the mid-2000s, Katz had engaged in a multi-year consensual relationship with a female undergraduate student in the classics department in violation of university policy on faculty-student relationships. The investigation resulted in Katz taking a year of unpaid leave as a suspension. It was not made public until 2021.

Political essays and backlash 
Throughout 2020–2021, Katz wrote essays in The Wall Street Journal, The Spectator, Quillette, and National Review, among others, criticizing political correctness. His July 2020 essay in the online magazine Quillette, which opposed faculty recommendations to address racist aspects of Princeton's history, also criticized a former Princeton student group, the Black Justice League, describing it as "a small local terrorist organization that made life miserable for many (including the many black students) who did not agree with its members’ demands". Katz received backlash from colleagues, including the Princeton Department of Classics chair Michael Flower, but was praised by the editorial board of The Wall Street Journal and columnist Rod Dreher for speaking out against cancel culture once the story reached national attention. A university spokesperson initially said it would look into the controversy, but it opted not to investigate. In July 2020, Katz wrote a piece for the Wall Street Journal titled "I Survived Cancellation at Princeton." After the American Council of Learned Societies (ACLS) revoked his invitation to be a volunteer delegate to the Union Académique Internationale conference in Paris, Katz sued the ACLS in 2021 for viewpoint discrimination. A judge dismissed the lawsuit.

Second investigation and firing 
In February 2021, The Daily Princetonian reported the university's 2018 misconduct investigation that had led to Katz's suspension. Katz acknowledged breaking the university's rules. Princeton began a second investigation, which concluded in November 2021 that Katz had "misrepresented facts" in the 2018 inquiry and had discouraged the former student in the relationship from cooperating with it. Supporters of Katz, including the American Council of Trustees and Alumni (ACTA) and the Foundation for Individual Rights in Education, criticized the university, alleging the investigation sought to suppress Katz's free speech rights.

Princeton University president Christopher L. Eisgruber called for Katz's removal from the university on May 10, 2022, based on the new evidence from the second investigation. Katz was dismissed from the faculty, entirely, after a vote by the university's board of trustees on May 23, 2022. The Wall Street Journal published an opinion article by Katz soon after, in which he alleged that the university had fired him for political reasons and had misrepresented his positions to provoke dissent.

Other activities 
When plans for the University of Austin were announced in 2021, Katz joined its board of advisors. He is a nonresident senior fellow at the American Enterprise Institute.

Personal life 
In July 2021, Katz married Solveig Gold, a doctoral candidate in classics at University of Cambridge, who graduated from Princeton in 2017 and is one of his former students.

Notes

References

External links
 His page at Princeton University
 His page at the Guggenheim Foundation
 Transcript of his Interview with Shilo Brooks at the University of Colorado, Boulder

1969 births
Living people
Academics from New York (state)
Linguists from the United States
Princeton University faculty
Institute for Advanced Study faculty
Academic staff of the Humboldt University of Berlin
Academic staff of Paris Diderot University
Yale College alumni
Alumni of the University of Oxford
Harvard Graduate School of Arts and Sciences alumni
Marshall Scholars
American Enterprise Institute